The Linth–Limmern Power Stations are a system of hydroelectric power stations located south of Linthal in the canton of Glarus, Switzerland. The system uses five reservoirs and four power stations at steep variations in altitude.

Works on the complex began in 1957 with the construction of Lake Limmern Dam and the Mutt, Tierfehd and Linthal Power Stations. The dam was complete in 1963 and the power stations were all operational by 1968, with an installed capacity of 340 MW. In 2009, a 140 MW pumped-storage component between Lake Limmern and Tierfehd Reservoir was commissioned. In 2010, construction began on the Linthal 2015 Project, which included the expansion of Lake Mutt and Tierfehd Reservoir, and the addition of the Limmern Power Station, a 1,000 MW pumped-storage component between Lake Mutt and Lake Limmern. Commissioning of the last unit in Limmern was completed by December 2017, bringing the total installed capacity of the system to 1480 MW.

Design and operation

A 2.2 MW solar farm was added to the Muttsee dam in 2021, supplying 3.3 GWh per year.

It has a direct discharge into the Linth river.

Between Lake Mutt and Lake Limmern are the Mutt Power Station, in service since 1965 containing a single 4.4 MW Pelton turbine, and the latest expansion to the complex, the Limmern Power Station, which completed commissioning in late 2017 and has four 250 MW Francis pump-turbine. This four reversible pump-turbines are of slip energy recovery variable-speed type. During periods of low demand, water can be pumped from Lake Limmern to Lake Mutt and when energy demand is high, the water is released down for generation. The same turbines that pump the water to Lake Mutt reverse into generator mode.

Lake Limmern also provides water to the Tierfehd Power Station further down in the valley for conventional hydroelectric generation and pumped-storage. This power station includes three 87 MW Pelton turbines, in service since 1964, and one 140 MW Francis reversible pump-turbine, that was added to the complex in 2009. Additionally, the Hintersand Balancing Reservoir provides water to two 20 MW Pelton turbines also within the Tierfehd Power Station. Also in this Power Station, a 34 MW electrically driven pump allows the transfer of water from Hintersand Reservoir up to Lake Limmern.

Water used for power generation at Tierfehd is discharged into the Tierfehd Balancing Reservoir. The water in this reservoir can either be pumped back up to Lake Limmern or directed down to the Linthal Power Station, which has two 17.2 MW Pelton turbines. From there, the Linthal Power Station discharges the water into the Linthal Balancing Reservoir and into the Linth river.

See also

List of pumped-storage hydroelectric power stations
List of tallest dams in Switzerland
List of power stations in Switzerland

Notes and references

External links

Linth-Limmern at Axpo AG
Drone video

Dams completed in 1963
Energy infrastructure completed in 1968
Dams in Switzerland
Arch dams
Hydroelectric power stations in Switzerland
Pumped-storage hydroelectric power stations in Switzerland
20th-century architecture in Switzerland